James Arthur Coan, Jr. (born July 11, 1969) is an American affective neuroscientist, clinical psychologist, writer, podcast host, human rights activist, and psychology professor at the University of Virginia in Charlottesville, where he serves as director of the Virginia Affective Neuroscience Laboratory.

Career 
In 1991, as an undergraduate at the University of Washington, Coan designed the Lost in the Mall technique that successfully implanted false memories first in his little brother, then in several subjects in a formal experiment supervised by psychology professor Elizabeth Loftus, and finally in many more subjects in several replication experiments by other researchers. These studies made national news, and contributed to the scientific discrediting of repressed memories. Advocates of recovered-memory therapy criticized Coan's method and attacked Loftus on ethical grounds.

Also as an undergraduate at UW, Coan began working in the marriage lab of psychology professor John Gottman, a collaboration that continued during Coan's doctoral work at the University of Arizona. Coan helped Gottman refine and expand the Specific Affect Coding System (SPAFF), a method for coding human emotion based on close observation of facial expressions—including minute, subtle expressions rarely noticed by untrained observers.

After completing his Ph.D., Coan emerged as a leading authority in interpersonal emotion regulation. Coan researched hand holding first as a postdoctoral fellow at the University of Wisconsin at Madison, and later as a professor at the University of Virginia. Using functional Magnetic Resonance Imaging, Coan showed that holding hands with a spouse relieved subjects' anxiety in response to anticipated threats, and that the degree of relief correlated positively with self-reported relationship quality. This work attracted international media attention, leading to a TED Talk and a recurring on-camera gig as a science expert on National Geographic Network's Brain Games science series. Coan appeared in nine episodes of Brain Games during the 2014 and 2015 seasons.

Coan attracted additional national press coverage for replicating the soothing effect of spousal handholding with committed same-sex couples, and for showing similar effects with close relatives and friends.

Coan's research on the psychological and physical health benefits of strong friend and family networks developed into Social Baseline Theory, which the Boston Globe described as arguing "that the human brain depends upon a sophisticated network of relationships to coordinate cognitive energies and accomplish shared goals, which [Coan] suggests is unique to humans. Unlike most primates, human beings are prepared to have multiple kinds of caregivers, and we tend to cooperate reflexively with one another from an early age. 'We have huge brains that are incredibly metabolically expensive,' Coan says. 'We’re not particularly good at physically defending ourselves compared to other mammals. Friendship is a fundamental feature of how we have been shaped by natural selection to continually adapt and survive.'” 

In April 2019, the New York Times consulted Coan on the psychology of physical boundaries in response to the Me Too movement as it applied to the campaign of Democratic presidential candidate Joe Biden.

Since 2017, Coan has hosted and produced the podcast Circle of Willis, where he interviews prominent scientists, including Lisa Feldmann Barrett, John Caciappo, Nilanjana Dasgupta, Lisa Diamond, Sue Johnson, Brian Nosek, Nicole Prause, Simine Vazire, David Sloan Wilson. In a special 2018 Halloween episode, Coan described his experience surviving a widowmaker heart attack earlier that year. Coan's Circle of Willis podcast is supported by the Virginia Quarterly Review and the University of Virginia's Center for Media and Citizenship.

In the summer of 2018, Coan engaged in activism against the Trump Administration's family separation policy. First, he produced a special Circle of Willis episode, "Children at the Border," featuring interviews with five leading experts detailing the physical and psychological harm the policy inflicts on children. Then, Coan penned a Washington Post op-ed condemning family separation, and was quoted by a Post reporter regarding the effects of family separation and no-touch policies on affected migrant children. In August 2018, Coan joined an amicus brief on behalf of affected children, filed with the Fourth Circuit Court of Appeals.

During the 2019-20 COVID-19 outbreak, Coan's hand-holding research attracted additional international media coverage; interviewers asked Coan to discuss how social distancing requirements could impact physical and mental health.

References

American neuroscientists
21st-century American psychologists
University of Washington alumni
University of Virginia faculty
University of Wisconsin–Madison fellows
1969 births
Living people
People from Silver Spring, Maryland
Writers from Maryland
20th-century American psychologists